The Worst Thing in the World is a Big Finish Productions audio drama featuring Lisa Bowerman as Bernice Summerfield, a character from the spin-off media based on the long-running British science fiction television series Doctor Who.

Plot 
The Drome was set 
Now Benny finds herself in a desperate fight for her life. A fight so desperate that she will be forced to do something she has never done before, a horror that she never imagined she could bring herself to commit. The worst thing in the world.

Cast
Bernice Summerfield - Lisa Bowerman
Jason Kane - Stephen Fewell
Marvin Glass - Bernard Holley
Hannah Glass - Jane Milligan
Jane Peters - Jenny Livsey
Zombettes - Karen Baldwin, Sean Conolloy, Simon Guerrier, Joseph Lidster, Edward Salt

Trivia
Bernard Holley has appeared on Doctor Who on TV: Peter Haydon (The Tomb of the Cybermen, 1967) and Axon Man (The Claws of Axos, 1971)

External links
Big Finish Productions - Professor Bernice Summerfield: The Worst Thing in the World 
Worst Things in the World 

Worst Thing in the World
Worst Thing in the World